The Men's 1500 metres event  at the 2004 IAAF World Indoor Championships was held on March 6–7.

Medalists

Note: Michael East had originally won the bronze but was disqualified for obstructing Laban Rotich.

Results

Heat
First 3 of each heat (Q) and next 3 fastest (q) qualified for the semifinals.

Final

References
 Results

1500
1500 metres at the World Athletics Indoor Championships